Beekdaelen is a municipality in the province of Limburg, situated in the southern Netherlands. It was formed as a merger of Nuth, Onderbanken and Schinnen.

Beekdaelen has 35,853 inhabitants. It does not have a capital. The town hall of the municipality is currently situated in the village Nuth, which is the biggest population centre in the municipality with 6,520 inhabitants. The other fourteen villages in the municipality are Amstenrade with 2,670 inhabitants, Bingelrade with 796 inhabitants, Doenrade with 1,122 inhabitants, Hulsberg with 3,954 inhabitants, Jabeek with 752 inhabitants, Merkelbeek with 1,564 inhabitants, Oirsbeek with 3,733 inhabitants, Puth with	2,004 inhabitants, Schimmert with 3,236 inhabitants, Schinnen with 2,692 inhabitants, Schinveld with 4,629 inhabitants, Sweikhuizen with 690 inhabitants, and Wijnandsrade with	1,631 inhabitants. The other population centres belong to one of the following villages.

Politics 

The Government of Beekdaelen is the government of the municipality of Beekdaelen in the province of Limburg in the Netherlands. Beekdaelen has been its own municipality since a merger of the old municipalities of Nuth, Onderbanken, and Schinnen. The municipality covers fifteen villages, the town hall is currently located in the village of Nuth. The first municipal election in Beekdaelen was in 2018.

Local government 

Results of the elections of 2018, and 2022:

Municipal Government 2018–2022
Following the 2018 municipal elections a coalition was formed consisting of CDA (Christian democratic), Vernieuwingsgroep (translation: Renewal Group, a local party), GroenLinks (green left), and PvdA (labour). In total 8 parties took part in the election, with 7 parties obtaining at least one seat.

In September 2021, Leon Rijkx (a councillor from CDA) left his party. He cited "the problematic culture within the local department of CDA". He joined the Vernieuwingsgroep and took his council seat with him, this increased the seat total of the Vernieuwingsgroep to 7 and decreased the seat total of CDA to 6, making the Vernieuwingsgroep the biggest party in terms of seat total.

Municipal Government 2022–current
Following the 2022 municipal elections a coalition was formed consisting of Vernieuwingsgroep (translation: Renewal Group, a local party), Beekdaelen Lokaal (translation: Beekdaelen Local, a local party), and CDA (Christian democratic). In total 7 parties took part in the election, with all parties obtaining at least one seat.

Topography

Dutch Topographic map of the municipality of Beekdaelen, November 2018

Notable people 

 Auguste Kerckhoffs (1835 in Nuth – 1903) a Dutch linguist, cryptographer and academic
 Frans de Wever (1869 in Nuth – 1940) a Dutch general practitioner, municipal doctor and hospital founder
 Theo Rutten (1899 in Schinnen – 1980) a professor of psychology and a Dutch politician 
 Johannes Herman Frederik Umbgrove (1899 in Hulsberg – 1954) was a Dutch geologist and Earth scientist
 Leo Wetzels (born 1951 in Schinnen) academic and Editor-in-Chief of Probus International
 Peter Akkermans (born 1957 in Hulsberg) a Dutch archaeologist and academic

Sport 
 Joep Packbiers (1875 in Nuth – 1957) a Dutch archer, competed at the 1920 Summer Olympics 
 Frans Korver (born 1937 in Schinnen) a Dutch former professional football player and manager
 Wim Ernes (1958 in Schimmert – 2016) a Dutch equestrian dressage coach
 Nadezhda Wijenberg (born 1964) a long-distance runner, lives in Schinnen,
 Julie Zwarthoed (born 1994 in Schinnen) a Dutch female ice hockey player

Gallery

References

External links

Official website

 
South Limburg (Netherlands)
Municipalities of Limburg (Netherlands)
Municipalities of the Netherlands established in 2019